Miss America 1998, the 71st Miss America pageant, was held at the Boardwalk Hall in Atlantic City, New Jersey on Saturday, September 13, 1997 and was televised by the ABC Network. ABC replaced NBC as the pageant's television home.

Results

Placements

* Finalist Roxana Saberi entered the journalism field and made international headlines in 2009 when she was imprisoned in Iran on charges of espionage; she was subsequently released.

Order of announcements

Top 10

Top 5

Awards

Preliminary awards

Non-finalist awards

Quality of Life awards

Judges
Angie Everhart
Jeanne Jackson
Julie Moran
Stephen Nichols
Kenny Ortega
Gerry Spence
Debbye Turner

Candidates

References

External links
 Miss America official website
 Miss America 1998
 Miss Illinois Beauty Pageant Controversy

1998
1997 in the United States
1998 beauty pageants
1997 in New Jersey
September 1997 events in the United States
Events in Atlantic City, New Jersey